A referendum on a new constitution was held in South Africa on 2 November 1983 in which the white population was given the opportunity to approve or reject the Constitution of 1983. This constitution introduced the Tricameral Parliament, in which coloured and Indian South Africans would be represented in separate parliamentary chambers, while black Africans, who were the majority of South Africa's population, would remain unrepresented. The referendum passed with 66.3% of voters voting "Yes"; consequently the new constitution came into force on 3 September 1984.

Background
In 1981 the Senate was abolished and replaced with the President's Council, which was an advisory body consisting of sixty nominated members from the white, coloured, Indian and Chinese population groups. Following a request by Prime Minister P.W. Botha, the President's Council presented a set of proposals in 1982 for constitutional and political reform. This proposal called for the implementation of "power sharing" between the white, coloured and Indian communities.

The right wing of the ruling National Party (NP) rejected this proposal and a group of its MPs, led by Dr. Andries Treurnicht, a cabinet minister and the leader of the NP in the Transvaal province, broke away to form the Conservative Party (CP) in order to fight for a return to apartheid in its original form. However, Botha continued to be in favour of implementing the President's Council proposal and in 1983 the NP government introduced a new constitutional framework. A referendum was called for in order to determine public support for the reforms amongst white voters. The New Republic Party led by Vause Raw supported the new constitution, although it continued to call for black representation in Parliament.

Opposition
Both the Progressive Federal Party (PFP), which objected to the exclusion of blacks, as well as the CP, which objected to the participation of coloureds and Indians, campaigned for a "No" vote. However, many PFP followers and parts of the anti-government English language press supported the new constitution as "a step in the right direction". The conservative opposition to the reforms used banners with the text "Rhodesia voted yes – vote no!" reflecting on the transformation to majority rule in Rhodesia.

The response of Coloured, Indian and black leaders were mixed. The new constitution was rejected by most Bantustan leaders and the Urban Councils Association of South Africa (representing the black township administrations) because it did not provide for black representation. Coloured and Indian parties that intended to participate in the Tricameral Parliament but also insisted on extending representation to the black majority.

The United Democratic Front (UDF) was launched as a non-racial coalition to oppose the referendum and the subsequent elections for the coloured and Indian chambers in parliament.

Results

By region
For counting purposes the provinces of South Africa were divided into various referendum areas. The following table shows the results in each area.

References

Referendums in South Africa
1983 in South Africa
1983 referendums
Constitutional referendums
November 1983 events in Africa
Apartheid in South Africa
Apartheid government
Suffrage